James Wilson Hogg (1909-1997) was a New Zealand-born headmaster of a CAS School in Australia and chairman of the Headmasters' Conference of the Independent Schools of Australia.

Biography
Jim Hogg was born in Wellington, New Zealand, and educated at Scots College, Wellington, and New Zealand University. In 1929 he entered Balliol College, Oxford, where he read History and graduated with a Master of Arts. After teaching in the United Kingdom and New Zealand he became senior English master at Knox Grammar School in Sydney. In 1944 he was appointed Headmaster of Trinity Grammar School and remained in that position for 31 years. In 1974 he was made a Member of the Order of the British Empire for his service to education. Hogg’s youngest daughter, Elizabeth Fensham, is a children and young adults’ author.

References

1909 births
1997 deaths
Australian headmasters
Officers of the Order of the British Empire
Chairmen of the Headmasters' Conference of the Independent Schools of Australia
People educated at Scots College, Wellington
Alumni of Balliol College, Oxford
University of New Zealand alumni
New Zealand emigrants to Australia